The Yamaha V-Max, (or VMAX) cruiser motorcycle was produced by Yamaha from 1985. Known for its 70° V4 engine, shaft drive, and distinctive styling, the V-Max was discontinued following the 2020 model year.

History
The V-Max was designed by Atsushi Ichijo in a team led by Akira Araki with input from Ed Burke and John Reed.

Upon its release in 1985, the V-Max garnered instant critical acclaim and earned the title "Bike of the Year" from Cycle Guide. Sold both in Japan and abroad, the V-Max was sold with only minor modifications from the 1985 model year until the 2007 model year. The V-Max was noted for its quick acceleration, but was also criticized for its poor cornering ability and soft suspension.

Until 2008, the original V-Max was offered for sale through the Star Motorcycles division of Yamaha Motorcycles. Apart from a minor freshening to the bike's specifications in 1993, when the bike gained a larger-diameter fork to minimize high-speed wobbling and drift, four-piston brake calipers, and other handling and safety related upgrades, the 2007 V-Max was almost the same as the original 1985 version.

Specifications
The engine was a tuned version of the double overhead camshaft, four valve per cylinder, liquid-cooled V-4 from the Yamaha Venture. Along with other modifications to the engine, the compression ratio was raised to 10.5:1, and the V-Boost system was added.

V-Boost
V-Boost is a system that opens butterfly valves in the intake manifold between the 1st and 2nd and between the 3rd and 4th cylinders starting from 5,750 rpm. The valves are opened gradually to match the rising engine speed with a signal provided by the ignition system. The valves are at the full open position at 8,000 rpm. A small black box sends a computed signal to a servo motor that pulls a wire to open the butterfly valves. The V-Boost system adds 10 percent to the top power rating of the base engine.

VMAX

In 2005, at the 39th Tokyo Motor Show, Yamaha displayed an all-new V-Max concept bike. It featured a new chassis, upgraded components all around, and state-of-the-art braking components.

On 4 June 2008, Yamaha officially released a completely redesigned 2009 VMAX in North America and Europe. The features of the VMAX include an all-aluminium frame with its   liquid-cooled 65° V4 DOHC engine used as a stressed member of the chassis, an electroluminescent instrument readout, Yamaha Chip Controlled Intake (YCC-I), fully adjustable suspension, anti-lock brakes, slipper clutch, a fuel tank beneath the seat, and a distinctive key.

On 20 September 2009, VMAX was also launched in India.

YCC-I/YCC-T

Instead of the V-Boost on the original carburated V-Max, the fuel injected VMAX uses YCC-I and YCC-T.
Yamaha Chip Controlled Intake (YCC-I) is a new addition to the VMAX. The airhorns inside the airbox are lifted by a servo activated at 6,650 rpm to open up the airway underneath. This shortens the length of the intake system from 150 mm to 52 mm. This system had its first appearance in the Yamaha stable with the 2006 YZF-R1. The MV Agusta F4 Tamburini was the first bike with such a system. Massimo Tamburini invented this idea. It is called Torque Shift System (TSS) on the Agustas.

Yamaha Chip Controlled Throttle (YCC-T) is also a new addition. The throttle cables are connected to a throttle position sensor and a new computer called G.E.N.I.C.H. that operates the butterfly valves, the EXUP valve in the exhaust and the other components involved, such as the igniter unit, and the YCC-I lifter unit. The YCC-T computes all the input of the sensors and calculates the best throttle position, ignition advance, EXUP valve and injection time in milliseconds.

Popular culture
In the video game Final Fantasy VII (1997), the protagonist Cloud Strife's Hardy Daytona motorbike is based on the Yamaha V-Max. It was also used by Nicolas Cage in Ghost Rider 2.

See also
List of Yamaha motorcycles

References

External links

 Canadian Motorcycle Guide Online 2009 V-Max press launch review

V-Max
Cruiser motorcycles
Motorcycles introduced in 1985